Dr. C. Darius Stonebanks (July 7, 1967) is a multiple award-winning Professor of Education with an international reputation in the areas of Action Research, Narrative Inquiry, Critical Methodologies, Secularism, Islamophobia, Anti-Racism, Social Justice, and Transformative Praxis. He has worked in Montreal’s inner-city elementary schools, the James Bay Cree territories as a CEGEP instructor and as the Director of a Community Campus dedicated to lifelong learning in Malawi. As an immigrant to Canada at a young age, with parents born in Iran and Egypt, Dr. Stonebanks uses his understandings as a racialized, visible minority to build capacity in those who are otherwise excluded from natural human rights in public spaces, such as Education. He is deeply committed to further opening Canada’s higher education to the next generation of BIPOC academics, researchers, and leaders. His latest honour was the 2022 Congress of Qualitative Inquiry “Career Award”.

Early life and education 
C. Darius Stonebanks was born on July 7, 1967, in London, England and was brought to Canada (Montreal, Quebec) in 1968. Much of his early writing examines the violent Islamophobia that occurred to his family in the West end of Montreal, which, in the 1970s and 1980s was dominated by White, English-speaking Canadians. He is one of the few academics who have examined the commonly racial slur of, “Paki”, arguing that this racism is often kept as a secret in White, English Canadian society. He graduated with a Bachelor’s degree from Concordia University in 1992. Stonebanks completed his Master of Arts in Educational Studies (Social and Behaviour) from Concordia University in 1996 and then went on to earn his Doctor of Philosophy (PhD) in Curriculum Studies (Dean’s Honour) at McGill University in 2005. The title of Stonebanks’ dissertation was James Bay Cree and Higher Education: Issues of Identity and Culture Shock, which was later revised and published under the same title, being one of the few publications on Canada’s Indigenous issues written from a racialized middle eastern perspective. His great aunt is the late Iranian feminist, activist and founder and head of the women’s section of the Communist Tudeh party, Maryam (Farman Farmaian) Firooz, whose actions and legacy played a large role in his upbringing.

Academic Positions 
In his late twenties, he and his young family moved to Mistissini, Quebec becoming an Instructor of Native Early Childhood Education for CEGEP de St. Felicien. Upon returning to Montreal he worked as a pedagogical consultant for the English Montreal School Board as well as a student teacher supervisor and university instructor for McGill University.

In 2005 Stonebanks left Montreal for the Eastern Townships to take on the position of Assistant Professor at Bishop’s University in the School of Education. He was the Chair of the Research Ethics Board and remained at Bishop’s advancing to Full Professor in 2013. He was awarded the status of Adjunct Professor at McGill University in the Department of Integrated Studies in Education in 2015.

During his time at Bishop’s University, he won two divisional teaching awards, the overall Chancellor award for teaching, and the 2010 National Association of Multicultural Teachers Philip C. Chinn Book Award, for Muslim Voices in School: Narratives of Identity and Pluralism, co-authored with Özlem Sensoy. C. Darius Stonebanks was the Chair of the Research Ethics Board at Bishop’s University from 2009 – 2012 and in 2014 and the Interim Chair of the Ethics Review Committee on Student Research in 2014. As well, he has sat as the Chair of the Doctoral Awards Committee for the Social Studies and Humanities Research Council (SSHRC) from 2017-2019.

Controversy 
On November 16, 2022, C. Darius Stonebanks, a tenured Full Professor was terminated by Bishop’s University. Prior to his termination, Stonebanks had been vocal of the experiences of systemic racism at Bishop’s University, noting the (ongoing) absence of BIPOC administration and leadership, as well as the mistreatment of Indigenous students by both professors and administration. His case is presently awaiting arbitration supported by both the Association of Professors of Bishop’s University (APBU) and the Canadian Association of University Teachers (CAUT). The APBU Executive response to his termination is as follows, and noted systemic racism:The APBU is aware of the action taken by the Administration of Bishop’s University against Dr. Christopher Darius Stonebanks and is in communication with him about the way forward.  The APBU is gravely concerned about this action taken and the underlying issues of procedural fairness, the right to a safe workplace free from discrimination, notably racial discrimination, and reprisal, and the right to academic freedom. We are continuing to work with Dr. Stonebanks and legal representation to ensure the rights of Dr. Stonebanks and all members are respected and upheld.

Research (notable)

Black, Indigenous and People of Colour Academic Coalition (BIPOCAC) 
Founded in 2022, the BIPOCAC mandate is to unite BIPOC members and stakeholders of academia against ongoing systemic racism in Canadian universities. Although Higher Education in Canada and the Global North freely acknowledge the existence of Systemic Racism in universities, little has been done to change the inequity beyond “diversity window dressing”. Through a unified effort, the BIPOCAC aims to break the cycle of racial inequity through Unity, Research, Education and Advocacy. They are currently finalizing a website (www.bipocac.org) and accompanying modes of knowledge mobilization that include an online periodical devoted to opinion pieces, commentary, and research findings, called the BIPOCAC Chronicle, and a podcast devoted to BIPOC issues in higher education. Their launch date for the not-for-profit is coming by year’s end (2022), and they are commencing their efforts with an invitation for all Canadian university student unions to participate in organizing change through education seminars to clarify how systemic racism operates in universities, and the common methods that are utilized to give appearances of change while maintaining the status-quo.

Transformative Praxis Malawi 
Transformative Praxis Malawi (TPM) is a community owned campus that began in 2008, that engages in the areas of Education, Health and Development. Stonebanks received primary “seed money” funding from the Ahmad Jahan Foundation of Switzerland. The design of the campus is based on meeting the identified needs of local community and then organically shaping and developing space to meet demand. Stonebanks is currently the Director of TPM’s Canadian not-for-profit arm.

Islamophobia 
Largely set within an anti-racism framework, Stonebanks’ research stems from the context of racialized Muslims living in diaspora within the Global North. He regularly challenges the assumption that Islamophobia is a “post 9/11” phenomenon in Canada. His SSHRC funded research on the secular nature of public schooling focussed on the potential bias of administrators, parents, and teachers using the notion of secularism as meaning “normal” to the status quo, while excluding other beliefs, practices or worldviews as falling outside of the neutrality of the public space. Stonebanks is also the founder of Islam, Muslim and Qualitative Inquiry for ICQI (2018–Present). This is a special interest group dedicated to critically examining past and current qualitative methods of research regarding Islam and Muslims striving towards practices that empower from within and benefit humanity as a whole.

Published Works 

 Stonebanks, C. Darius. (2021). “(re)discovering Pedagogy of the Oppressed”. LEARNing Landscapes. Vol. 14 No. 1 
 Stonebanks, C. Darius. (Feb,2021). “Are Canadian universities in any position to lead Anti-Racism movements?”. University Affairs/Affaires universitaires. 
 Stonebanks, C. Darius, Bennett-Stonebanks, Melanie & Norrie, Kassandra. (2020). “School Administration Gatekeeping on ‘Sensitive/Controversial’ Research Topics: Applying Critical Inquiry to Empower Teacher Voice on Secularism”. International Review of Qualitative Research. Vol. 12 No. 4, Winter 2019. 
 Stonebanks, C. Darius. (2019). “Action Research, Ethics, the Politics of Academia, and People”. Canadian Journal of Action Research. (20)1. 
 Bennett-Stonebanks, M., Stonebanks, C. D & Mphande, T. (2019). “Ethics and Action Research in emancipation-based endeavours; Projects of heart or projects of publication?”. Canadian Journal of Action Research. (20)1. 
 Stonebanks, C. Darius. (2019). “Secularism and Securitization: The imaginary threat of religious minorities in Canadian public spaces”. Journal of Beliefs & Values (Studies in Religion & Education). (Taylor & Francis). (40)3. 
 Bennett-Stonebanks, M.& Stonebanks, C. Darius (2018). “Self-Defining as Professionally Secular in the Public Space: Reflecting on Teacher Identity and Practice”. in (Ed) Lyle, E. The Negotiated Self: Employing Reflexive Inquiry to Explore Teacher Identity. Netherlands: Sense Publishing.
 Stonebanks, C. Darius. (2018). “The Dilemma of Christmas in the Secular Public School”. in (Eds) Ryan, James & Griffiths, Darrin. Case Studies of Inclusive Educators & Leaders. Burlington, Ontario: Word & Deed Publishing Inc. 
 Stonebanks, C. Darius. (2018). “Reading Shiva Naipaul; a reflection on Brownness and leading an Experiential Learning Project in Malawi”. in (Ed) Stanley, Phiona. Questions of culture in Autoethnography. Abingdon: Routledge. 
 Stonebanks, C. Darius. (2017). “Multiculturalism and the Canadian Pre-Service Teacher: Made in the USA?” In (Ed.) Lyle, E. At the Intersection of Selves and Subject: Exploring the Curricular Landscape of Identity. New York: Springer. 
 Sheerin, F., Stonebanks, C. D, Jeffery, K., Schouten, K. (2016). “Health and Wellness in Rural Malawi: A Community Health Development Initiative” in RCNi (Journal of Royal College of Nursing). 
 Stonebanks, C. Darius, Sheerin, F, Bennett-Stonebanks, M & Paradise, J. (2016). "Just give the Money to the Women: Overly simplified advice that works in International Education, Health and Development Initiatives". in (Eds.) Normore and Watson. Racially and Ethnically Diverse Women Leading Education: Global Perspectives. UK: Emerald Group Publishing. 
 Stonebanks, C. Darius. (2014). "Confronting Old Habits Overseas: An Analysis of Reciprocity between Malawian Stakeholders and a Canadian University". in (Eds.) Denzin, Norman & Giardina, Michael. Qualitative Inquiry Outside the Academy. CA: Left Coast Press. 
 Stonebanks, C. Darius. (2013). "Cultural Competency, Culture Shock and the Praxis of Experiential Learning”. In Lyle, E. & Knowles, G. (Ed.) Bridging the Theory-Practice Divide: Pedagogical Enactment for Socially Just Education. Nova Scotia: Backalong Books. 
 Stonebanks, C. Darius. (2012). “Discovering ‘Brownness’ in a College Humanities Classroom”. In Kress & Lake (Eds). We Saved the Best for You: Letters of Hope, Imagination and Wisdom. New York: Teachers College Press. 
 Stonebanks, C., Steinberg, S. & Kincheloe, J. (2010). Teaching Against Islamophobia. New York: Peter Lang Publishing.
 Stonebanks, C. Darius. & Stonebanks, Melanie. (2010). “Religious Identity in schools and the Looking Glass Self”. in Daniel Chapman (Ed) Teaching Social Theory. NY: Peter Lang Publishing.
 Stonebanks, C. Darius. (2010). “The Audacious Scholar: The Dude Minds!”. Cultural Studies↔Critical Methodologies (Sage Publications). (10)5 
 Stonebanks, C. Darius. (2010). “On critical thinking, Indigenous knowledge and raisins floating in soda water”. in Adams, Tippins, Mueller & van Eijck (Eds.) Cultural Studies and Environmentalism: The Confluence of EcoJustice, Indigenous Knowledge Systems and A Sense of Place. NY: Springer. 
 Stonebanks, C. Darius. & Wootton, Kathleen. (2010). “The Backlash on ‘Roosting Chickens’: The Continued Atmosphere of Suppressing Indigenous Knowledge”. Cultural Studies↔Critical Methodologies (Sage Publications). (10)2. 
 Stonebanks, C. Darius. (2010). “Middle-Eastern Boys”. in Michael Kehler and Shirley R. Steinberg (Eds). Boy Culture. Westport, CT: Greenwood Press. 
 Stonebanks, C. Darius. (2009). “If Nancy Drew wouldn’t wear a Hijab, would the Hardy Boys wear a Kufi?”. In Stonebanks & Sensoy, O. (Eds.) Muslim Voices in Schools: Narratives of Identity and Pluralism. Netherlands: Brill Publishing. 
 Stonebanks, C. Darius. & Steinberg, Shirley. (2009). "Life and Work of Joe". International Review of Qualitative Research. (1)4. 
 Stonebanks, C. Darius. & Stonebanks, Melanie. (2009). “Religion and Diversity in our Classrooms”. in Shirley R. Steinberg (Ed). Diversity: A Reader. New York: Peter Lang Publishing.
 Stonebanks, C. Darius. & Sensoy, Ozlem (2009).” Schooling Identity: Constructing Knowledge about Islam, Muslims and People of the “Middle-East” in Canadian Schools”. The International Journal of Critical Pedagogy. (2)4. 
 Stonebanks, C. Darius. & Sensoy, Özlem (Eds). (2009). Muslim Voices in School: Narratives of Identity & Pluralism. Boston: Sense Publishing. 
 Stonebanks, C. Darius. (2009). “Secret Muslims”. Cultural Studies↔Critical Methodologies (Sage Publications). (9)6. 
 Stonebanks, C. Darius. (2008). James Bay Cree and Higher Education: Issues of Identity and Culture Shock. Boston: Sense Publishing. 
 Stonebanks, C. Darius. (2008). "Politicized Knowledge to Standardized Knowing: The Trickle-Down Effect in Schools". in (Eds.) Denzin, Norman & Giardina, Michael. Qualitative Inquiry and the Politics of Evidence. CA: Left Coast Press. 
 Stonebanks, C. Darius. (2008). “An Islamic perspective on knowledge, knowing and methodology”. in (Eds.) Denzin, N., Lincoln, Y., & Smith, L. Handbook of Critical and Indigenous Methodologies. CA: Sage Publications. 
 Stonebanks, C. Darius. & Sensoy, Ozlem. (2008). "Did we miss the joke again? The cultural learnings of two Middle East professors for make benefit insights on the glorious West". Taboo: The Journal of Culture and Education. Spring/Summer. 
 Stonebanks, C. Darius. (2008). “Spartan Superhunks and Persian Monsters; Responding to Truth and Identity as determined by Hollywood”. Studies in Symbolic Interaction. (Sage Publications). Vol. 31. 
 Stonebanks, C. Darius. & Wootton, Kathleen. (2008). “Revisiting Mianscum’s ‘telling what you know’ in Indigenous Qualitative Research”. International Review of Qualitative Research (Left Coast Press). Vol. 1:08. 
 Stonebanks, C. Darius. (2006). “The Stonebanks Report”. (in Mackay, Miller & Quinn) The Student Life History Project: Complicated Lives. Cégep Vanier Collège. Montreal, Quebec, Canada. 
 Stonebanks, C. Darius. (2004). “Consequences of Perceived Ethnic Identities (reflection of an elementary school incident)” in The Miseducation of the West: The Hidden Curriculum of Western-Muslim Relations. Joe L. Kincheloe and Shirley R. Steinberg (Eds.) New York: Greenwood Press.

Podcasts 

 Producer of “The Insubordinate Teacher Podcast” by Stonebanks, Emory, Faucher and Stonebanks.
 Producer (forthcoming) of “The BIPOC Academic Coalition Podcast” by Stonebanks, Faucher and Avolonto.
 Guest on “The Action Research Podcast” by Adam Stieglitz and Joseph Levitan.

Living people
Year of birth missing (living people)